The Karate International Council of Kickboxing (KICK) was a sanctioning body that regulates kickboxing matches.  It is considered among the more prestigious organizations that sanction professional kickboxing.

KICK was organized in 1982 by Frank Babcock, Fred Wren, Larry Caster, Bob Wall and Roy Kurban, with martial arts icon Chuck Norris serving as a goodwill ambassador.  It grew into one of the largest kickboxing organizations of the 1980s.

See also
List of male kickboxers
List of female kickboxers

References

External links
 KICK International (amateur program)

1982 establishments in the United States
Sports organizations established in 1982
Karate in the United States
Kickboxing organizations
Karate organizations
Organizations based in St. Louis